Chmielnik may refer to:
Chmielnik, a town in Świętokrzyskie Voivodeship (central Poland)
Chmielnik, Lublin Voivodeship (east Poland)
Chmielnik, Opole Voivodeship (south-west Poland)
Chmielnik, Podlaskie Voivodeship (north-east Poland)
Chmielnik, Subcarpathian Voivodeship (south-east Poland)
Chmielnik, Masovian Voivodeship (east-central Poland)
Chmielnik, Kętrzyn County in Warmian-Masurian Voivodeship (north Poland)
Polish name for Khmilnyk in Ukraine